Spain's only Rugby World Cup appearance was in 1999 when they competed in Pool A against South Africa (Springboks), Scotland and Uruguay.  Spain lost all three games, and finished the tournament ranked 18th out of 20 teams.

They successfully qualified for the 2023 World Cup to be hosted in France. However, Spain was later on disqualified due to falsification of a copy of an ineligible player's passport.

Spain has not hosted any Rugby World Cup games.

Qualifying
 1987 Rugby World Cup – Not invited
 1991 Rugby World Cup – Did not qualify.
 1995 Rugby World Cup – Did not qualify.
 1999 Rugby World Cup – Qualified as Europe 6 by beating Portugal 21-17.
 2003 Rugby World Cup – Did not qualify. Spain lost to the United States 120-26 in aggregate in a two-match repechage.
 2007 Rugby World Cup – Did not qualify. Spain lost to Romania 43-20 and Georgia 37-23 during European qualification.
 2011 Rugby World Cup – Did not qualify.  Spain finished 5th with a 2-8 record in the qualifying tournament, the 2008-10 European Nations Cup.
 2015 Rugby World Cup – Did not qualify.
 2019 Rugby World Cup – Did not qualify.

By matches

1999 Rugby World Cup
Pool A matches

Overall record

Team Records
Most Points Scored
15 vs  1999
3 vs  1999

Most Points Conceded
48 vs  1999
47 vs  1999
27 vs  1999

Worst Losing Margin
48 vs  1999
44 vs  1999
12 vs  1999

Individual Records
Most Points
15 Andrei Kovalenco
3 Ferran Velazco Querol

Most Points in a Game
15 Andrei Kovalenco vs 
3 Ferran Velazco Querol vs 

Most Tries

Most Drop Goals
1 Ferran Velazco Querol

References

Bibliography
 Davies, Gerald (2004) The History of the Rugby World Cup (Sanctuary Publishing Ltd,
 Farr-Jones, Nick, (2003). Story of the Rugby World Cup, Australian Post Corporation,

Rugby World Cup by nation
World Cup